Wiewiórka may refer to:

Wiewiórka, Łódź Voivodeship (central Poland)
Wiewiórka, Subcarpathian Voivodeship (south-east Poland)
Wiewiórka, Warmian-Masurian Voivodeship (north Poland)